The effects of Hurricane Dennis in Georgia included two deaths and $24 million (2005 USD) in damage. On June 29, 2005, a tropical wave emerged off the west coast of Africa. Gradually, the system organized on July 2 and formed a broad low pressure area. The system continued to organize, and it became a tropical depression on July 4. Tracking westward, it became a tropical storm on July 5 and a hurricane on July 7. Dennis rapidly intensified to attain Category 4 status on the Saffir-Simpson Hurricane Scale before making landfall on Cuba. The storm weakened to Category 1 status before re-emerging in the Gulf of Mexico and intensifying to a Category 4. Dennis weakened before the cyclone made landfall on the Florida Panhandle on July 10, then tracked over southeast Alabama.

Dennis had moderate effects in the state, primarily from flooding. Flash flooding occurred in several areas, damaging hundreds of homes and businesses. Light to moderate wind gusts of  combined with saturated ground downed several trees, one of which fell into a house, killing a man near Atlanta. A man also died while working with utility crews to restore power. One tornado was reported, downing 200 trees.

Preparations
In anticipation of the storm, the National Weather Service placed much of central, north and western Georgia under a flood watch. A wind advisory was also in effect for Clayton, Cobb, DeKalb and Fulton Counties. As the hurricane's outer rainbands approached the state, a tornado watch was put into effect for central portions of the state. The Red Cross provided 80 shelters in the state, in addition to hundreds of volunteers. Due to large evacuations in the state, construction projects on Interstates 75, 85, and 185, were postponed.

Flooding

Damage from Hurricane Dennis in Georgia was mostly minor to moderate. Moderate to heavy rainfall began on July 10 and persisted into the morning hours of July 11.
Flash flooding occurred in Colquitt County, flooding the Okapilco Creek which damaged numerous homes, washed out several roads, and forced people from more than 100 homes to evacuate. Minor flooding occurred along the Flint and Withlacoochee River basins with a few homes affected by high water. In Worth County, a total of 300 homes were evacuated due to rising flood water, with 80 homes being flooded. In Dougherty County, dozens of homes and businesses in lost electric power. Additionally, flooding was confined to both sides of State Highway 82 near the Worth County border. Fishpond Drain in Seminole County flooded with several homes surrounded by rising water. A dam burst caused a torrent of water to overwash a road in Tift County, Georgia. Several rescues were required, particularly in Douglas and Cobb counties.

In Baldwin County, torrential rainfall and flooding led to the collapse of a fitness center; two employees were injured. In Carroll County, more than 20 roads were either washed out or damaged by raging flood waters. A man in Upson County sustained injuries when he drove onto a washed-out road. His vehicle was subsequently swept down the creek.

The Lamar County Emergency Management Director reported that several dirt roads in the county were flooded and some were washed out. De Kalb County had many of its streams and creeks surpass flood stage, causing minor damage to businesses and homes. Spalding County also reported 15 roads with extensive flooding damage. Fourteen mobile homes in Clayton County were damaged beyond repair by the flooding; 52 residents were evacuated. In Riverdale, several homes were flooded, although damage was generally limited to the basements of the homes. In Fayette County, the historic Starrs Mill was inundated, and water rose to the bridge level on McDonough Road. There was also a dam breach on Lake Fowler, causing $300,000 dollars (2005 USD) in damage.

One of the worst-hit areas was Douglas County, where rainfall reached . Ten roads in the county required major repair and seven others were flooded and closed for some period of time. 42 trailer homes were either submerged or heavily damaged by flood waters, and six homes sustained minor damage from flood waters. A car dealership was also flooded, damaging about 100 used cars and 20–30 new cars. Damage across the county was placed as $6 million (2005 USD). There were unofficial reports that Kings Highway between Interstate 20 southwest of Douglasville and Fouts Mill was flooded.

An apartment building in Cherokee County received extensive damage from flooding, forcing the evacuation of its residents by boat. Water was up to the first floor level of many of the apartments of the complex. Also, businesses and hotels were flooded along Interstate 575 near Georgia State Route 92. About 15 homes suffered severe damage in the area. The Noonday Creek reached a record stage of  feet at 1200 UTC, exceeding the previous record stage of  feet on September 17, 2004, during Hurricane Ivan. At least one road in the county was closed due to high waters. Damage in Cherokee County was estimated at $1.6 million (2005 USD), primarily from damage to the apartment building.

In Worth County, 78 people were displaced by the flooding. A total of 300 homes were evacuated and 80 damaged by the flood waters, causing $1.8 million (2005 USD) in damage. $1.3 million (2005 USD) in damage was also reported in Colquitt County due to the flooding of several homes and businesses. In total, over 100 buildings had to be evacuated.

Wind damage
The lowest barometric pressure also occurred at Albany, dropping to 1007.5 mb. Counties in the western part of the state reported downed trees and powerlines, with widespread power outages across the region. In Decatur, a man was killed when a large tree fell onto his bedroom. Near Atlanta, there were closures on two major interstate highways due to high water; one bridge was closed south of the city. Also, a tractor trailer overturned on a two-lane road, sending the driver to the hospital and closing the road for several hours. In total, about 55,000 customers lost electricity, with 38,000 of them being from the Atlanta area. A man also died while working with utility crews to restore power. Also, a large tree fell on a woman's house, trapping her. Emergency crews managed to safely remove her, although damage to her home was extensive.

A large building in Bartow County was damaged by wind gusts, causing almost $10,000 dollars (2005 USD) in damage. In Douglas County, a tree fell on a car on Interstate 20 causing damage to the vehicle, although no one was injured. In another incident, a tree fell onto a home on Campbellton Street. Several trees and power lines down in Fulton County, with the worst damage in the southwest portion of the county. Several trees were also down in Roswell. The Roswell Cat Clinic was forced to close when a large tree fell on the facility. Also, a home in North Atlanta was damaged when a large oak tree fell on its deck. U.S. Route 100 had to be closed for a brief period because of downed trees in Hall County. In all, wind damage totaled up to $246,000 dollars (2005 USD).

Tornadoes
The White County Emergency Management Director reported that an F0 tornado touched down in the southwest corner of White County near the Hall County line at the Wauka Valley Farms area, which formed on the tail end of a feeder band associated with the remnants of Hurricane Dennis. The tornado path width was estimated to be approximately 1/8 to 1/4 mile wide. Significant damage was reported at the Wauka Valley Farms facility. Hundreds of trees were uprooted, and two barns were completely destroyed. One structure sustained room damage and a number of trees and power lines were also down along Town Creek road. Overall, in excess of 200 trees were down in the southwest part of the county.

See also

Effects of Hurricane Dennis in Mississippi
Effects of Hurricane Dennis in Florida
Effects of Hurricane Dennis in Alabama

References

External links
Hurricane Dennis advisory archive

Dennis (2005)
Dennis
Georgia
2005 in Georgia (U.S. state)
Dennis Georgia